Union Kleinmünchen is a football team from  Linz in Austria, currently competing in the ÖFB-Frauenliga. Founded in 1980, it is the third most successful club in the championship after SV Neulengbach and USC Landhaus Wien with eight titles.

Union Kleinmünchen dominated the Frauenliga through the first half of the 1990s with five titles in a row and competed for primacy with Landhaus through the rest of the decade, winning three doubles between 1996 and 1999. The 2000s were far less successful; the club was the championship's runner-up in 2005, but it was relegated in 2008.

After two years in the 2. Frauenliga Union Kleinmünchen returned to top flight for the 2011 championship, ending second to last.

Titles
 8 Austrian Leagues (1990 — 1994, 1996, 1998, 1999)
 6 Austrian Cups (1991, 1993, 1995, 1996, 1998, 1999)
 1 Austrian Supercup (2001)

2017-18 squad

References

Association football clubs established in 1980
Organisations based in Linz
Sport in Linz
Women's football clubs in Austria
1980 establishments in Austria